The 2007 WDF World Cup was the 16th edition of the WDF World Cup darts tournament, organised by the World Darts Federation. It was held in Rosmalen, Netherlands from October 11 to 14. This event was televised by Eurosport

Men's singles

Women's singles

Other winners

Final points tables

Men

Women

Youth

References

External links
 Results and statistics for 2007 World Cup

WDF World Cup darts
2007
WDF World Cup
Darts in the Netherlands